T. albida may refer to:
 Terminalia albida, a tree species found in West Africa
 Tillandsia albida, a plant species endemic to Mexico
 Trypeta albida, a fruit fly species